Jānis Alfrēds Vītols (18 February 1911 – 1993) was a Latvian cyclist. He competed in the individual and team road race events at the 1936 Summer Olympics.

References

External links
 

1911 births
1993 deaths
Latvian male cyclists
Olympic cyclists of Latvia
Cyclists at the 1936 Summer Olympics
Sportspeople from Jelgava